"Trojan Horse" is the twentieth episode of the third series of the 1960s cult British spy-fi television series The Avengers, starring Patrick Macnee and Honor Blackman. It was first broadcast by ABC on 8 February 1964. The episode was directed by Laurence Bourne and written by Malcolm Hulke.

Plot
Steed and Cathy face horse racing jockeys that are acting as assassins armed with binoculars firing poison darts.

Cast
 Patrick Macnee as John Steed
 Honor Blackman as Cathy Gale
 Basil Dignam as Major Ronald Pantling 
 T. P. McKenna as Tony Heuston 
 Derek Newark as Johnson 
 Arthur Pentelow as George Meadows 
 Geoffrey Whitehead as Right Honorable Lucien Ffordsham 
 Lucinda Curtis as Ann Meadows 
 John Lowe as Lynton Smith 
 James Donnelly as Kirby

References

External links

Episode overview on The Avengers Forever! website

The Avengers (season 3) episodes
1964 British television episodes